A rondel is a wheel-shaped game mechanism with a number of different options. A rondel game (or aspect of a game) is one in which a player's choice of actions is limited by their ability to move around the rondel, and so the player is restricted from taking the same action repeatedly. A player is usually able to move farther around the rondel by paying a cost.

See also
 Mac Gerdts
 Imperial
 Imperial 2030
 Trajan (board game)

References

Board game terminology